Shallenberger  is a surname. Notable people with the surname include:

Ashton C. Shallenberger (1862–1938), American politician, governor of Nebraska 1909–11
Oliver B. Shallenberger (1860–1898), American engineer and inventor
William Shadrack Shallenberger (1839–1914), American politician from Pennsylvania

See also
Shellenberger
Schellenberger
Schellenberg
Callenberg